Dabal may refer to:
 a misspelling of Dabala
 a misspelling of Dabalo
 a misspelling of Dąbal
 a misspelling of Dąbale